Bartholomaeus Stockmann (Braunschweig, c. 1550 - possibly 1609) was a Danish composer. His 1590 publication Musica Nuptialis is the oldest collection of motets from Denmark.

References

1550s births
1600s deaths
Danish Baroque composers
Musicians from Braunschweig
People from Brunswick-Lüneburg
17th-century classical composers
Male classical composers
17th-century male musicians